The Simon Plimpton Farmhouse is a historic farm     in Southbridge, Massachusetts.  It was probably built about 1789 by Simon Plimpton and his brother Baxter on family-owned land.  Baxter Plimpton eventually deeded his share over to Simon; the house has been in the hands of Plimpton descendants since.  The house is a -story wood-frame house, five bays wide, with a center chimney.  Although the house is nominally Federal in its styling, there are Greek Revival details (the broad eaves and door frames) that may have been added later.  The full-width front porch is a late 19th-century addition.

The house was listed on the National Register of Historic Places in 1989.

See also
National Register of Historic Places listings in Southbridge, Massachusetts
National Register of Historic Places listings in Worcester County, Massachusetts

References

Federal architecture in Massachusetts
Houses completed in 1819
Houses in Southbridge, Massachusetts
National Register of Historic Places in Southbridge, Massachusetts
Houses on the National Register of Historic Places in Worcester County, Massachusetts